Acraea braesia is a butterfly in the family Nymphalidae. It is found in Ethiopia, Somalia, north-eastern Uganda, eastern and northern Kenya and north-eastern Tanzania.

Description

A. braesia Godm. Forewing long and narrow with the distal margin nearly straight, basal half of the upper surface reddish yellow-brown, apical half transparent grey with free yellow spots at the distal margin and black marginal band, which is but little widened at the apex. Hindwing above orange-yellow, often with rose-red tinge, at the base scarcely blackish and with black, unspotted marginal band, proximally somewhat undulate; the discal dots often only showing through from beneath; under surface of the hindwing more or less reddish, with distinct black dots and almost streak-shaped light yellow marginal spots. German and British East Africa; Abyssinia. - f. regalis Oberth. (55 e) has beyond discal dots 3 to 6 on the fore wing a well 
defined, almost transparent grey subapical band, but the forewing is otherwise densely scaled. German and British East Africa.

Biology
The habitat consists of dry thornbush country.

Taxonomy
It is a member of the Acraea caecilia species group. See also Pierre & Bernaud, 2014.

References

External links

Die Gross-Schmetterlinge der Erde 13: Die Afrikanischen Tagfalter. Plate XIII 55 e regalis
Images representing Acraea braesia at Bold
Acraea braesia at Pteron

Butterflies described in 1885
braesia
Taxa named by Frederick DuCane Godman
Butterflies of Africa